Turner Soccer Complex is a 1,700-capacity stadium located in Athens, Georgia. It is primarily used for soccer and serves as the home field for the Georgia Bulldogs women's soccer team.  The complex is named for Hoyt "Jack" Turner, an Athens native who has financially supported Bulldogs soccer and other athletic endeavors for several years.

Turner Soccer Complex hosted the 2000 Southeastern Conference Women’s Soccer Tournament.

External links
 Turner Soccer Complex

Georgia Lady Bulldogs soccer
Soccer venues in Georgia (U.S. state)
Sports venues completed in 1998
Buildings and structures in Athens, Georgia
1998 establishments in Georgia (U.S. state)